Chalfant is a surname. Notable people with the surname include:

 Henry Chalfant (born 1940), American photographer and videographer, husband of Kathleen
 Jefferson David Chalfant, American painter
 Kathleen Chalfant (born 1945), American actress
 Kevin Chalfant, American singer-songwriter